The 1976 PGA Championship was the 58th PGA Championship, played August 12–16 at Congressional Country Club (Blue Course) in Bethesda, Maryland, a suburb northwest of Washington, D.C. Held six weeks following the United States Bicentennial, it was the second major at Congressional; the U.S. Open was conducted twelve years earlier in 1964.

Dave Stockton, the 1970 champion, sank a  putt to save par on the 72nd hole to win his second PGA Championship, one stroke ahead of runners-up Raymond Floyd and Don January. The final round was delayed to Monday for the first time, due to weather. Stockton's final putt averted the first sudden-death playoff in major championship history, which came a year later at the 1977 PGA Championship.

Defending champion Jack Nicklaus shot a final round 74 (+4) and finished two strokes back, in a tie for fourth. Third round leader Charles Coody shot 77 and fell into a tie for eighth.

Course layout

Past champions in the field

Made the cut

Missed the cut

Source:

Round summaries

First round
Thursday, August 12, 1976

Source:

Second round
Friday, August 13, 1976

Source:

Third round
Saturday, August 14, 1976
Sunday, August 15, 1976

Source:

Final round
Sunday, August 15, 1976 (cancelled)
Monday, August 16, 1976

After the third round was completed on Sunday morning, the fourth round was begun but then scratched due to weather; the partial scores were cancelled with a fresh start on Monday.

Source:

References

External links
PGA.com – 1976 PGA Championship

PGA Championship
Golf in Maryland
Bethesda, Maryland
PGA Championship
PGA Championship
PGA Championship
PGA Championship